Pyeongan-dong (평안동, 坪安洞) is a neighborhood of Dongan district in the city of Anyang, Gyeonggi Province, South Korea.

External links
 Pyeongan-dong 

Dongan-gu
Neighbourhoods in Anyang, Gyeonggi